The Chebsin or Tsopsin were a Circassian tribe. They were destroyed in the Circassian genocide following the Russo-Circassian War.

Etymology 
Tsopsin in translation from Adyghe means "shining spring".

History 
The Chebsins were recognized in the historiography and ethnography of the Caucasus until the end of the Russian-Circassian War.  

In the aftermath of the Russo-Circassian War, with the Chebsin people's land occupied, the survivors migrated to Natukhaj. During the ensuing Circassian genocide, the Natukhaj were exterminated. The few survivors migrated to Turkey, where they were assimilated into other tribes or the Turks. 

After the end of the Russian-Circassian War, the Chebsins were no longer mentioned, as they were destroyed in the Circassian genocide. The dialect of the Adyghe language was also lost.

Mentions by historians and travelers 
1857 - Lyulie, Leonty Yakovlevich wrote:

"...The Chebsins, relatives of the Zhaneys, are now only a memory, giving their names to one of the valleys adjacent to the Black Sea. They were mostly destroyed, now they have merged with the Natukhaj..."

1871 - Russian historian, academician, lieutenant general Nikolai Fedorovich Dubrovin wrote: 

"...Among the Natukhaj, people of  three other Adyghe tribes were destroyed and merged: Chebsin, Khegayk, and Khatuq or Adale, who lived on the Taman peninsula, now scattered in different places among the Natukhaj people..."

References 

Circassian tribes
History of Kuban
Historical ethnic groups of Russia
Adygea